Vacarezza is a surname. Notable people with the surname include:

Adriana Vacarezza (born 1961), Chilean actress
Gerardo Vacarezza (born 1965), Chilean tennis player
Marcela Vacarezza (born 1970), Chilean television presenter and psychologist, sister of Marcela

See also
Vaccarezza